Montana is the 41st state of the United States.

Montana may also refer to:

Places

Bulgaria
 Montana Province
 Montana Municipality
 Montana, Bulgaria, a city

United States
 Montana, Arkansas, an unincorporated community
 Montana, Kansas, an unincorporated community
 Montana, New Jersey, an unincorporated community
 Montana City, Montana, a census-designated place
 Montana, West Virginia, an unincorporated community
 Montana, Wisconsin, a town
 Montana (community), Wisconsin, an unincorporated community within the town
 Episcopal Diocese of Montana, encompassing the state

Elsewhere
 Montana, Tasmania, Australia, a locality
 Montana Indian Reserve No. 139, an Indian reserve near Hobbema, Alberta, Canada
 Montana (Mesoamerican site), an archaeological site near Balberta, Escuintla, Guatemala
 Montana, Switzerland, a municipality in the canton of Valais
 797 Montana, an asteroid

People

Given name
 Montana Cox (born 1993), Australian model
 Montana Slim, stage name of Wilf Carter (1904–1996), Canadian country music singer, songwriter, guitarist and yodeler
 Arthur Montana Taylor (1903–1958), American boogie-woogie and blues pianist

Surname
 Montana (surname), a list of people with the surname Montana or Montaña

Stage and ring names
 Alibi Montana (born 1978), stage name of Nikarson Saint-Germain, a French rapper of Haitian origin
 Amber Montana, stage name of American actress Amber Frank (born 1998)
 Billy Montana, American country music singer-songwriter William Schlappi (born 1959)
 Duke Montana, Italian underground rapper, actor and businessman Duccio Barker (born 1975)
 French Montana, stage name of American rapper Karim Kharbouch (born 1984)
 Joey Montana, Panamanian reggaeton singer Edgardo Antonio Miranda Beiro (born 1982)
 Lenny Montana, American professional wrestler, mobster, and actor (debuting in The Godfather) born Leonardo Passafaro (1926–1992)
 Marcus Montana, stage name of Australian pop singer and one-hit wonder Marcus Lagudi
 Montie Montana, rodeo trick rider, actor, stuntman and cowboy born Owen Harlen Mickel (1910–1998)
 Patsy Montana, American country music singer-songwriter Ruby Rose Blevins (1908–1996)
 Randy Montana, American country singer Randy Schlappi (born 1985), son of William Schlappi, aka "Billy Montana"
 Small Montana, ring name of Filipino boxer Benjamin Gan (1913–1976)

Arts, entertainment, and media

Fictional characters
 Montana (comics), a Marvel Comics villain character, first appearing in 1964
 Montana Jones, the title character of Montana Jones, an Italian-Japanese anime series broadcast from 1994 to 1995
 Lindsay Monroe or Montana, in CSI: NY
 Hannah Montana (character), the title character of the television series Hannah Montana
 Léon Montana, the main character in the 1994 film Léon: The Professional
 Tony Montana, played by Al Pacino in the 1983 film Scarface
 Montana Max, in Tiny Toon Adventures

Films
 Montana (1950 film), a western starring Errol Flynn
 Montana (1990 film), an American Western film
 Montana (1998 film), an American crime drama
 Montana (2014 film), a British film by Mo Ali
 Montana (2017 film), an Israeli film by Limor Shmila

Music
 Montana (band), an Australian power pop band
 Montana (album), a 2019 album by French Montana

Songs
 "Montana" (state song), the state song of Montana
 "Montana" (Frank Zappa song), 1973
 "Montana", a 1999 song by John Linnell from State Songs
 "Montana", a 2011 song by Youth Lagoon from his album The Year of Hibernation
 "Montana", Justin Timberlake from Man of the Woods 2018
 "Montana", a 2018 song by Owl City from Cinematic

Periodicals
 La Montaña, an Argentine socialist publication published in 1897
 Montana The Magazine of Western History, a magazine highlighting the history of the Western United States

Other arts, entertainment, and media
 Montana (solitaire) or Gaps, a solitaire card game

Brands and enterprises
 Montana's BBQ & Bar, a Canadian-owned restaurant chain
 Montana Wines, New Zealand's largest wine company

Naval vessels
For the steamboat, see #Transportation.
 Montana (ship), an American Civil War paddle steamer intended to be a Confederate blockade runner, but wrecked off Bermuda in 1863
 , various US Navy ships
 Montana-class battleship, a World War II-era class of five US Navy ships that were never built

Schools
 Institut Montana Zugerberg, a boarding school in central Switzerland
 University of Montana, Montana, United States
 Montana Grizzlies and Lady Griz athletic teams representing the university

Science
Montana (bush cricket), a genus of bush crickets in the tribe Platycleidini
Latin binomial abbreviations for species:
A. montana (disambiguation)
B. montana (disambiguation)
C. montana (disambiguation)
D. montana (disambiguation)
E. montana (disambiguation)
F. montana (disambiguation)
G. montana (disambiguation)
H. montana (disambiguation)
I. montana (disambiguation)
K. montana
L. montana (disambiguation)
M. montana (disambiguation)
N. montana (disambiguation)
O. montana (disambiguation)
P. montana (disambiguation)
R. montana (disambiguation)
S. montana (disambiguation)
T. montana (disambiguation)
V. montana (disambiguation)
W. montana
Z. montana (disambiguation)

Transportation
 Montana (steamboat), a Missouri River steamboat built in 1879 that sank in 1884
 Chevrolet Montana, a light pickup truck sold in Latin America; began production 2003 
 Montana Austria, a defunct Austrian airline
 Montana Rail Link, a privately held US Class II railroad
 Pontiac Montana, a General Motors minivan; began production 1998

See also

Montanan (disambiguation)
Montana Band (disambiguation)
Montano (disambiguation)
Montanus (disambiguation)
Montanum (disambiguation), part of the name of various species